Ariane Rädler (born 20 January 1995) is a World Cup alpine ski racer from Austria. Born in Bregenz, Vorarlberg, she specializes in the speed events of downhill and super-G.

World Cup results

Season standings

Race podiums
0 wins
1 podium – (1 SG); 4 top tens (1 DH, 3 SG)

World Championship results

Olympic results

References

External links
 

1995 births
Living people
Austrian female alpine skiers
People from Bregenz
Alpine skiers at the 2022 Winter Olympics
Olympic alpine skiers of Austria
Sportspeople from Vorarlberg
20th-century Austrian women
21st-century Austrian women